Woodville is a hamlet, in the town of Naples, Ontario County, New York, United States.
It is located on the Canandaigua Lake. Parts of Woodville are in the town of South Bristol, New York.

Notes

Hamlets in Ontario County, New York
Hamlets in New York (state)